Ord och inga visor is an EP with Gothenburg band LOK. It was released in 1996.

Track listing

 "Experiment" - 3.26
 "Som en hund" (Like A Dog) - 4.31
 "Rosa" (Pink) - 3.35
 "Natten till imorgon (den här är till Dig)" (All Night Long (This One Is For You))- 5.22
 "Plyschbeklädd" (Dressed In Velour) - 1.56
 "Rosendröm" (Dream Of Roses) - 2.08

Credits
 Martin Westerstrand – Vocals
 Thomas Brandt – Guitar
 Daniel Cordero – Bass
 Johan Reivén – Drums

LOK (band) albums
1996 EPs
Albums produced by Fredrik Nordström